was a politician and cabinet minister in the pre-war Empire of Japan.

Background
Kawasaki was born in what is now part of the city of Kure, Hiroshima as the second son of a local doctor. He graduated from Tokyo Imperial University’s Law School, continuing on to do post-graduate research in comparative political systems before obtaining a post at the Home Ministry. In 1916, he was appointed governor of Fukushima Prefecture, and in 1919 was sent to Taiwan as Director-General for Home Affairs, and subsequently  Director-General for Agriculture and Commerce. In 1922, Kawasaki was appointed mayor of Nagoya. Under his administration, the Yagoto Baseball Ground was built, and the first Japanese High School Baseball Invitational Tournament was held in 1924.

Later in 1924, Kawasaki was recalled to Tokyo to assume the post of Director-General of the National Police Agency under the Home Ministry. He became Deputy Home Minister in 1925. In 1926, he was invited to take a seat in the House of Peers in the Diet of Japan. He was recruited by Osachi Hamaguchi and Wakatsuki Reijirō to join the Kenseikai political party, and in 1927 joined the Rikken Minseitō.

In 1929, Kawasaki served in the Hamaguchi administration as Director-General of the Cabinet Legislation Bureau. In 1931, he served in the second Wakatsuki administration as Chief Cabinet Secretary . He was outspoken against the growing influence of fascism in Japan. In 1935, he became the leader of the Minseitō party.

Kawasaki was then picked to become Minister of Education by Prime Minister Keisuke Okada on February 1, 1936. However, the cabinet was forced to resign only a few weeks later due to the February 26 Incident. Prime Minister Kōki Hirota then asked that Kawasaki accept the post of Home Minister. This choice was opposed by the Imperial Japanese Army, who wanted control over that powerful ministry, and Kawasaki was sidelined to become Minister of Commerce and Industry. However, Kawasaki died before his formal investiture ceremony could even take place.

References
 Yagami, Kazuo. Konoe Fumimaro and the Failure of Peace in Japan, 1937-1941. McFarland (2006) 
 Johnson, Chalmers. Miti and the Japanese Miracle: The Growth of Industrial Policy : 1925-1975. Stanford University Press (1982)

Notes

 
 

1871 births
1936 deaths
People from Hiroshima Prefecture
Governors of Fukushima Prefecture
Mayors of Nagoya
Government ministers of Japan
Members of the House of Peers (Japan)
University of Tokyo alumni
Kenseikai politicians
Rikken Minseitō politicians
20th-century Japanese politicians